Pierce Academy (sometimes spelled Peirce) (1808–1880) was a college preparatory school in Middleborough, Massachusetts. The school was founded in 1808, fell into decline in 1872 when Middleborough High School opened, had only 12 students in 1876, and closed in 1880. The building was later used for the YMCA and G.A.R.

A deal was proposed for the school to provide high school education for up to 50 Middleborough students. From 1842 to 1871, John Whipple Potter Jenks was principal. J. W. P. Jenks served as principal.

Alumni
Henry King Bailey
William Crogman
Major General Leonard Wood

References

External links
Picture of Pierce Academy building c.1900 - postcard

Educational institutions established in 1808
Educational institutions disestablished in the 1880s
Middleborough, Massachusetts
Schools in Plymouth County, Massachusetts
1808 establishments in Massachusetts
Defunct schools in Massachusetts